Ramgadhawa  is a settlement area in Birgunj Metropolitan City. It comes under the subdivision (Ward No.) 24 of the metropolitan city which is in Parsa District in the Province No. 2 of southern Nepal. At the time of the 2011 Nepal census it had a population of 6,668 people living in 996 individual households. Another area in Ward No. 24 of Birgunj is Bahuari which comes under Ramgadhawa.

References

Populated places in Parsa District